The Ronnie Barker Playhouse was a series of six comedy half hours showcasing the talents of Ronnie Barker. All were broadcast by Associated-Rediffusion in 1968.

The series was written by Brian Cooke, Hugh Leonard, Johnnie Mortimer and Alun Owen. The executive producer was David Frost, while the producers were Stella Richman and actress Stella Tanner. All the episodes were directed by Michael Lindsay-Hogg.

Episode list
Show 1 - Tennyson
Transmitted 3 April 1968
Also starring Dudley Jones, Richard O'Callaghan, Talfryn Thomas, Gwendolyn Watts.
Show 2 - Ah, There You Are
Transmitted 10 April 1968
Also starring George A. Cooper, Sandra Michaels, Bill Shine (actor), Victor Winding and Michael Gues
Show 3 - The Fastest Gun in Finchley
Transmitted 17 April 1968
Also starring Walter Horsbrugh, Colin Jeavons, Sheila Keith, Glenn Melvyn, Charlotte Mitchell
Show 4 - The Incredible Mister Tanner
Transmitted 24 April 1968
Also starring Alec Clunes, Frank Gatliff, Doris Hare, Richard O'Sullivan and Billy Cornelius.
Show 5 - Talk of Angels
Transmitted 1 May 1968
Also starring Liz Crowther, Gillian Fairchild, Donald Hewlett, David Kelly, Maureen Toal
Show 6 - Alexander
Transmitted 8 May 1968
Also starring Pamela Ann Davy, Molly Urquhart, Pauline Yates and Anthony Trent.

Archive status
Of the six shows only Tennyson and The Fastest Guy In Finchley are missing from the archives, after the rediscovery of the other episodes at the BFI in 2012.

References

External links

BFI Database on Six Dates With Barker
Lost UK TV Shows

1968 British television series debuts
1968 British television series endings
1960s British anthology television series
ITV comedy
1960s British comedy television series